Dobermann is a 1997 French crime film directed by Jan Kounen starring Tchéky Karyo, Vincent Cassel, and Monica Bellucci.

Plot
The charismatic criminal Dobermann (Vincent Cassel), who got his first gun when he was christened, leads a gang of brutal robbers with his beautiful, deaf girlfriend Nat the Gypsy (Monica Bellucci). After a complex and brutal bank robbery, they are being hunted by the Paris police. The hunt is led by the sadistic cop Christini (Tchéky Karyo), who only has one goal: to catch Dobermann at any cost. He manages to catch gang member Olivier, who is also a transvestite named Sonia. Christini threatens to kill Olivier's baby if he does not help him to catch the gang. Olivier has no choice and visits a party in a disco where the other gang members celebrate their robbery. He informs Christini with an alarm transmitter that all gang members are here so the police start a raid.
After a gun fight the police arrest several members of the gang but some manage to escape, including Dobermann, who flees into a hidden basement which also has monitoring screens to show what happens in the disco.
As Christini kills Pitbull and abducts Nat with a car to rape her, Dobermann leaves his hiding place and follows him in a stolen ambulance. He overtakes Christini and manages to wrestle him down in the car. Dobermann grinds the head of Christini on the road while still driving the car at high speed as revenge for the killed friends. Christini is left heavily disfigured on the road, presumably dying.
The surviving gang members are able to escape and bury Sonia (the personage), suggesting that her treason results in Olivier having to drop his transvestite role. As they leave the scene in their cabrio a police helicopter is shown following them, with their car in its sights.

Cast
Tchéky Karyo as Christini
Vincent Cassel as Yann Lepentrec "Dobermann"
Monica Bellucci as Nat the Gypsy
Antoine Basler as Jean-Claude Ayache "Moustique"
 as Elie Frossard dit l'Abbé
 Marc Duret as Inspecteur Baumann
Florence Thomassin as Florence
Romain Duris as Manu
François Levantal as Léo

Sequel
On May 24, 2011, Dobermann 2: Arm Wrestle was announced. Vincent Cassel is in talks to reprise the role of Dobermann, and will have a $35 million budget.

References

External links 
 
 

1997 films
1997 crime thriller films
1990s English-language films
French crime thriller films
1990s French-language films
Films directed by Jan Kounen
1990s French films